Kuso is a term used in East Asia for the internet culture that generally includes all types of camp and parody. In Japanese,  is a word 
that is commonly translated to English as curse words such as fuck, shit, damn, and bullshit, and is often said as an interjection. It is also used to describe outrageous matters and objects of poor quality. This usage of kuso was brought into Taiwan around 2000 by young people who frequently visited Japanese websites and quickly became an internet phenomenon, spreading to Taiwan and Hong Kong and subsequently to Mainland China.

From Japanese kusogē to Taiwanese kuso
The root of Taiwanese "kuso" was not the Japanese word kuso itself but . This term was eventually brought outside of Japan and its meaning shifted in the West, becoming a term of endearment (and even a category) towards either bad games of nostalgic value and/or poorly-developed games that still remain enjoyable as a whole.

This philosophy soon spread to Taiwan, where people would share the games and often satirical comments on BBSes, and the term was further shortened. Games generally branded as kuso in Taiwan include Hong Kong 97 and the Death Crimson series.

Because kusogē were often unintentionally funny, soon the definition of kuso in Taiwan shifted to "anything hilarious", and people started to brand anything outrageous and funny as kuso. Parodies, such as the Chinese robot Xianxingzhe ridiculed by a Japanese website, were marked as kuso. Mo lei tau films by Stephen Chow are often said to be kuso as well. The Cultural Revolution is often a subject of parody too, with songs such as I Love Beijing Tiananmen spread around the internet for laughs.

Some, however, limit the definition of kuso to "humour limited to those about Hong Kong comics or Japanese anime, manga, and games". Kuso by such definitions are primarily doujin or fanfiction. Fictional crossovers are common media for kuso, such as redrawing certain bishōjo anime in the style of Fist of the North Star, or blending elements of two different items together. (For example, in Densha de D, both Initial D and Densha de Go! are parodied, as Takumi races trains and drifts his railcar across multiple railway tracks.)

In China, earlier e'gao works consisted of images edited in Adobe Photoshop. An example of this would be the Little Fatty internet meme.

Compared to e'gao
In Chinese, kuso is called "e'gao", with the first character meaning "evil" or "gross" and the second meaning "to make [fun] of [someone/something]." In 2007 the word was so new that it was not listed in Chinese dictionaries.

According to Christopher Rea, "E'gao, the main buzzword associated with online Chinese parody, literally means 'evil doings' or 'malicious manipulation; he notes that e'gaos "semantic associations [to kuso] can be misleading, however, since e'gao is not fundamentally scatological—or even, as the Chinese term might suggest, malicious. In its broad usage, it may be applied to parody of any stripe, from fan tribute-mimicry to withering mockery. In a more restricted sense, it refers the practice of digitally manipulating mass culture products to comic effect and circulating them via the internet. The term e'gao may thus be interpreted in multiple senses, as it denotes variously a genre, a mode, a practice, an ethos and a culture."

See also

 Internet meme
 Internet slang
 List of Internet phenomena in China
 Japanese mobile phone culture
 Shitposting
 Internet troll
 B movie
 Détournement
 Kuso Miso Technique

References

Sources
 Meng, Bingchun. "From Steamed Bun to Grass Mud Horse: E Gao as alternative political discourse on the Chinese Internet ." Global Media and Communication. April 2011. Vol. 7. No. 1. Pages 33–51. DOI 10.1177/1742766510397938.
 Christopher Rea, "Spoofing (e’gao) Culture on the Chinese Internet." In Humour in Chinese Life and Culture: Resistance and Control in Modern Times . Jessica Milner Davis and Jocelyn Chey, eds. Hong Kong: Hong Kong University Press, 2013, p. 151.

Citations

External links

kusoness.com
KusoHappens
KUSO came, RichyLi.com URL accessed on 3/30/2006. 
Let's Kuso! URL accessed on 3/30/2006. 

Humour
Chinese culture
Internet culture
Japanese words and phrases
Internet in China